Lee Jun-soo(born June 17, 1988) was the catcher of KT Wiz of the KBO League. He joined Kia Tigers in 2007. After that, he belonged to Hanwha Eagles in 2012, and he moved to KT Wiz in 2017. He graduated Shin-il High school.

References

External links 
 Lee Joon-soo on Baseball Reference

KT Wiz players
Baseball catchers
1988 births
Living people